James Manson (born 2 November 1966) is a former Australian rules footballer who played in the VFL/AFL for Collingwood and Fitzroy.

From North Hobart Football Club in Tasmania, Manson provided some great assets to a fighting Collingwood Magpies. Manson stood at 194 cm and was solidly built (108 kg) with a great overhead mark. He however had a very awkward kicking style, with the action very different from most footballers, as he overlooked the ball with a cramped style as he dropped it on the boot. He did however kick over 100 goals with the Magpies. Manson was part of the 1990 premiership side, and had a key role in the finals series. Manson played as a ruckman who moved forward, or the other way around. With young ruckman Damian Monkhorst also at Victoria Park, Manson struggled to maintain his position in the team later in his career as 'Monkey' developed each season. Manson was then traded to Fitzroy where he played for three seasons before retiring.

Manson's father Jim played 210 games for Glenorchy Football Club.

References

External links 

1966 births
Living people
Collingwood Football Club players
Collingwood Football Club Premiership players
Fitzroy Football Club players
North Hobart Football Club players
Tasmanian State of Origin players
Australian rules footballers from Tasmania
Tasmanian Football Hall of Fame inductees
One-time VFL/AFL Premiership players